The Tender Storm is an album by American jazz saxophonist Eddie Harris recorded in 1966 and released on the Atlantic label.

Reception
The Allmusic review states "In a sense, this LP was really the calm before the storm, the album where Eddie Harris unveiled some new wrinkles in his act that would explode on the very next album Electrifying, while hewing tightly to a standard acoustic quartet format. Here he starts to use the Varitone amplified saxophone, albeit very discreetly, as he sticks mostly to the doubled octave effects for a suave tone that allows for some slippery swinging".

Track listing
All compositions by Eddie Harris except as indicated
 "When a Man Loves a Woman" (Calvin Lewis, Andrew Wright) - 6:16 
 "My Funny Valentine" (Lorenz Hart, Richard Rodgers) - 6:02 
 "Tender Storm" - 5:31 
 "On a Clear Day (You Can See Forever)" (Burton Lane, Alan Jay Lerner) - 7:09 
 "A Nightingale Sang in Berkeley Square" (Eric Maschwitz, Manning Sherwin) - 4:27 
 "If Ever I Would Leave You" (Lerner, Frederick Loewe) - 7:55 
Recorded in New York City on March 8 (track 5), and September 19 (tracks 1-4 & 6), 1966

Personnel
Eddie Harris - tenor saxophone, varitone
Ray Codrington - trumpet (track 5)
Cedar Walton - piano
Ron Carter - bass
Billy Higgins (track 5), Bobby Thomas (tracks 1-4 & 6)  - drums

References 

Eddie Harris albums
1966 albums
Albums produced by Nesuhi Ertegun
Atlantic Records albums